Oliver Provstgaard Nielsen (born 4 June 2003) is a Danish professional footballer who plays as a centre-back for Danish 1st Division club Vejle Boldklub.

Career
Provstgaard joined Vejle Boldklub as an U13 player from Bredballe IF. He played his way up through the youth ranks at Vejle. 17-year-old Provstgaard was selected for Vejle's first team for the first time when he was in the squad for a Danish Cup game against Hobro IK on 7 October 2020. Provstgaard, however, had to watch the entire match from the substitutes' bench. Two months later, Provstgaard suffered a serious knee injury in an U-19 match, requiring surgery and an 8-month break.

However, although he was injured, the club confirmed on 7 June 2021, that Provstgaard had signed a new deal until June 2024, which would take effect from 1 January 2022. At the same time, he would become a permanent part of the first team squad. On 27 May 2022, Vejle once again gave Provstgaard a new contract, this time until June 2026.

With a number of injuries in Vejle's defence, Provstgaard made his official debut for the club on 14 April 2022 against OB in the Danish Superliga, where he played the entire match.

References

External links

2003 births
Living people
Danish men's footballers
Denmark youth international footballers
Association football defenders
Danish Superliga players
Danish 1st Division players
Vejle Boldklub players